Strange Cruise is the eponymously titled album by the short-lived British band Strange Cruise released on EMI. Released in 1986, it was the band's only album.

Background
After Visage disbanded in 1985, vocalist Steve Strange put a new band together the same year. The recording of the album took place in late 1985 in Germany, in a studio near Nuremberg. Mike Hedges produced the album, with contributions from Simon Hanhart and Steve Forward.

The album was a commercial disappointment, failing to enter the chart. Two singles taken off the album, "Rebel Blue Rocker" and a cover of Sonny & Cher's "The Beat Goes On", were also unsuccessful. There was also a B-side called Silver Screen Queen.

Track listing
All tracks written by Steve Strange and Steve Barnacle, except from "The Beat Goes On", written by Sonny Bono, and "12 Miles High", written by Steve New.

"Hit and Run" – 3:06
"The Beat Goes On" – 3:26
"Rebel Blue Rocker" – 3:15
"Communication (Breaking Down the Walls)" – 4:00
"This Old Town" – 3:15
"Animal Call" – 2:54
"Heart Is a Lonely Hunter" – 3:44
"Love Addiction" – 2:55
"12 Miles High" – 2:50
"Where Were Their Hearts" – 3:44

Personnel
Steve Strange - vocals
Wendy Wu - vocals (credited as Wendy Cruise)
Frankie Hepburn - guitar, backing vocals
Steve Barnacle - bass guitar, backing vocals
Pete Barnacle - drums, backing vocals
Pete Murray - synthesizer, backing vocals

Additional Musicians
Gary Barnacle - saxophone
 Pete Thoms - trombone
 Luke Tunney - trumpet
 Martin Ditcham - percussion

References

1986 debut albums
Albums produced by Mike Hedges
EMI Records albums
Pop rock albums by English artists